James Michael Cummings (born April 20, 1968 in South Boston, Massachusetts) is an American actor, writer and producer and is the founder and CEO of Broadvision Entertainment.  Cummings wrote and appeared in the movie Southie, which won the American Independent Filmmaker Award at the 24th annual Seattle International Film Festival.  He is also a co-founder of Journey Forward, a non-profit organization dedicated to bettering the lives of those who have suffered a spinal cord injury.

Career
Cummings began his career studying acting at the HB Studios in New York and at The Lee Strasberg Theatre Institute in New York and Los Angeles. He established himself as an actor with roles in the theater productions Dumb Waiter, The Street Poet and Tom Topor's Answers (which he also produced). After taking leading roles in the films Close Up and The Compulsion, he began to produce his own project titled Southie. He wrote the script and secured financing, then found a director (John Shea) and worked alongside Donnie Wahlberg, Rose McGowan, Will Arnett and Amanda Peete. In 1998 Southie was screened at festivals including the Nantucket Film Festival, the AFI Film Festival, the Montreal Film Festival and the Dublin Film Festival. Southie went on to win the Best Picture at the 24th annual Seattle International Film Festival.

Cummings owned and was head of development for Silent Partner Entertainment from 2003 to 2006. He produced six episodes of the TV series Hollywood OS and the documentary Dig Fenway. He wrote and developed film projects including Mad Cowboys, The Tony Conigliaro Story and Golden: The Harry Agganis Story. He worked for 20th Century Fox as a staff writer and sold screenplays to producers Gale Anne Hurd, Valhalla Motion Pictures, Joel Silver at Silver Pictures and to studios like Warner Brothers. He has also worked with Donnie Wahlberg as an acting coach for the films and TV shows The Sixth Sense, Band of Brothers, Dreamcatcher, The Practice, Purgatory, Boomtown and The Taking of Pelham One Two Three.

From 2007 to 2012, Cummings was head of development at Gigapix Studios, where he produced the award-winning war documentary Baker Boys: Inside The Surge and also helped to guide Comedy Central's prime-time hit Workaholics.

Cummings is currently appearing in the Showtime TV series City on a Hill as the character Tommy Hayes. He is also producing a full-length film titled SOS, his follow up to Southie, and is being directed by Andrzej Bartkovowiak, as well as developing a television series titled White Noose.

References

External links
 
 Broadvision Entertainment profile
 thosewahlbergmen.com
 
 boston.com

1968 births
Living people
Male actors from Boston
Xaverian Brothers High School alumni